The 200 metres at the World Championships in Athletics has been contested by both men and women since the inaugural edition in 1983. It is the second most prestigious title in the discipline after the 200 metres at the Olympics. The competition format typically has two or three qualifying rounds leading to a final between eight athletes.

The championship records for the event are 19.19 seconds for men, set by Usain Bolt in 2009, and 21.45 seconds for women, set by Shericka Jackson in 2022. The men's world record has been broken at the competition on one occasion, and Bolt's championship record set in 2009 remains the world record as of 2015. The women's world record has never been broken at the competition.

Usain Bolt is the most successful athlete of the event, having won four successive titles from 2009 to 2015, and also a silver in 2007. Allyson Felix is the most successful woman, having won three straight titles (2005 to 2009). Two-time champion Merlene Ottey has won more medals in the 200 m than any other athlete, reaching the podium six times in a period stretching from 1983 to 1997. Calvin Smith and Michael Johnson are the only others to have won two world titles over the distance.

The United States is the most successful nation in the discipline, with twelve gold medals among a total of 31. Jamaica is the next most successful with seventeen medals and seven titles. East Germany, with two golds, is the only other nation to have provided multiple gold medallists.

Age 
All information from IAAF

 Gervais Kirolo, who ran in 1983, could be younger but his birthdate is not known more exactly than the year (1966).

Doping 
The first instances of doping bans affecting the 200 m at the World Championships came at the 2001 edition. The champion Marion Jones was stripped of her gold medal and bronze medalist Kelli White met the same fate. Debbie Ferguson, the sole remaining original medalist, was elevated to the gold medal. A third female athlete, Yekaterina Leshchova who ran in the heats, was also disqualified for doping. The first male doping disqualifications happened the same year, with quarter-finalists Christophe Cheval and Ramon Clay being the offenders. Doping persisted at the 2003 World Championships – White was the champion that year and her retrospective ban also affected this result. The 1997 champion Zhanna Block, fourth in 2003, was also disqualified. Anastasiya Kapachinskaya (herself banned for steroids in 2004) was promoted to the position of 2003 world champion.

The next 200 m athlete to be disqualified for doping was Ruqaya Al-Ghasra (a competitor in the heats only). Two positive drug tests were recorded by 200 m athletes at the 2013 World Championships in Athletics: Yelena Ryabova, who ran in the heats, and semi-finalist Yelyzaveta Bryzhina.

Medalists

Men

Multiple medalists

Medalists by country

Women

Multiple medalists

Medalists by country

Championship record progression

Men

Women

Finishing times

Top ten fastest World Championship times

References

Bibliography

External links 
Official IAAF website

 
World Championships in Athletics
Events at the World Athletics Championships